Phiaris siderana is a moth of the family Tortricidae. It was described by Georg Friedrich Treitschke in 1835. It is found from Scandinavia south to Italy and Hungary and from France east to Russia.

The larvae feed on Spirea, Aruncus and Filipendula species.

References

Moths described in 1835
Olethreutini
Moths of Europe